Alfonso Alex Ortiz (April 30, 1939 Ohkay Owingeh Pueblo, New Mexico – January 26, 1997) was a Native American cultural anthropologist.

Life
Ortiz graduated from the University of New Mexico in 1961, and from the University of Chicago with a master's degree and a Ph.D. in anthropology.  He taught at University of California at Los Angeles, Colorado College, Pitzer College and Princeton University, and at the University of New Mexico.

He was president of the Association on American Indian Affairs.
His San Juan Pueblo, Oral History tapes and papers are held at Princeton.

Legacy
In 1999, the National Endowment for the Humanities issued a grant for the University of New Mexico to establish the Alfonso Ortiz Center for Intercultural Studies.

Awards
 1975 Guggenheim Fellowship
 1982 MacArthur Fellows Program

Works
 
 New Perspectives on the Pueblos, University of New Mexico Press, 1972
 Handbook of North American Indians (volumes 9 and 10, Smithsonian Institution, 1979 and 1983
 To Carry Forth the Vine: an Anthology of Traditional Native North American Poetry.
 American Indian myths and legends	Richard Erdoes, Alfonso Ortiz (eds) Pantheon Books, 1984, 

Alfonso Ortiz Papers 1926-1993 (mostly 1960s-1980s) at Princeton University Library
Alfonso Ortiz Collection of Native American Oral Literature 1959-1965, at Princeton University Library

References

External links
"A Tribute to Alfonso Ortiz (1939-97)", Ted Jojola, Wíčazo Ša Review, Vol. 12, No. 2 (Autumn, 1997), pp. 9–11
"A Conversation with Alfonso Ortiz", Dewitt, Susan, La Confluencia, 1, 2, 32-9, Dec 76

1939 births
1998 deaths
Tewa people
University of New Mexico alumni
University of Chicago alumni
University of California, Los Angeles faculty
Colorado College faculty
Pitzer College faculty
Princeton University faculty
University of New Mexico faculty
MacArthur Fellows
People from Ohkay Owingeh, New Mexico
20th-century American anthropologists